Stenaelurillus guttiger, synonyms Aelurillus guttiger and Stenaelurillus natalensis, is  a species of jumping spider in the genus Stenaelurillus that lives across southern Africa. It was first described in 1901 by Eugène Simon. It feeds on termites, particularly Macrotermes and Odontotermes. Initially allocated to the genus Aelurillus the species was moved to its current genus in 1974. First found in South Africa, it has also been seen in Botswana, Mozambique and Zimbabwe. It is dark brown or brown, and has a pattern of white hairs on both the abdomen and carapace. The carapace has a pattern of two stripes and abdomen has a white pattern of straight and V-shaped stripes and spots. It is a very diverse species, with a wide range of different colours and patterns. It is distinguished by the design of its sexual organs. The male has an embolus that is short and crab like. The female has a flat plate epigyne with widely separated copulatory openings and insemination ducts and a deep narrow pocket.

Taxonomy
Aelurillus guttiger was first described by Eugène Simon in 1901. It was initially placed in the genus Aelurillus, which had been created by Simon in 1885. The genus name derives from the Greek word for cat. In 1974, it was moved to Stenaelurillus by D. J. Clark on the basis of its general appearance, and particularly the similarity between the markings on this spider and those on the abdomen and carapace of Stenaelurillus albopunctatus. This genus had been first raised by Simon in 1886 with the type species Stenaelurillus nigricaudus. In 2015, the genus was grouped with nine other genera of jumping spiders under the name Aelurillines. It has been placed in the subtribe Aelurillina in the tribe Aelurillini in the clade Saltafresia.

Meanwhile, in 2006, Charles R. Haddad and Wesołowska identified a new species, Stenaelurillus natalensis. It was one of over 500 species identified by the Polish arachnologist Wesołowska. This new species was generally similar to Stenaelurillus guttiger but differed in that the tip of the males's embolus was hidden and the chamber in the female's epigyne. However, in 2018, Dmitri V. Logunov and Galina N Azarkina found the various sexual organs to be similar across the various specimens of both species and consequently they combined the.two species under the current name. The holotype for Stenaelurillus natalensis was designated the holotype for Stenaelurillus guttiger.

Description
The spider is medium-sized and has an overall shape that is typical for the genus. However, the species shows an unusually high variation in colouration. This does not seem to be a geographical variation and, for example, males with different colour palpal bulbs and legs often live in the same area. It is differentiated from other members of the genus by its sexual organs.

The male spider has a pear-shaped brown or dark brown carapace that is covered in scales. It is marked with two stripes made of white hairs that travel from front to back and, sometimes two more that cross from side to side. It has a pattern that consists of a white stripe and V-shape on the front half and white spots on the rear half, sometimes one spot and sometimes three. Occasionally, the white hairs on the spiders rub off, removing the patterns. The clypeus and chelicerae vary. In some examples, a sparse covering of white hairs covers a dark brown, yellowish brown to brown or brown to dark brown clypeus while the chelcerae may have a few short white hairs or a densely covering of long white hairs. The eye field is black. The spider has yellow, brown or dark brown legs, yellow spinnerets at the front and middle and dark brown spinnerets at the back. The pedipalps are a combination of yellow and brown. The spider is distinguished from other members of the genus by its short embolus shaped like a claw sitting on a wide round base.

The female is similar to the male but with a larger abdomen. The colouration is similar to the male, but sometimes simpler and less bright. For example, some examples have a single stripe and two spots on the abdomen. The eye field is orange-brown and the pedipalps are brown-yellow. The epigyne has a flat plate with widely separated copulatory openings and a deep narrow pocket. It has lateral copulatory openings. Although it is similar to Stenaelurillus furcatus, it can be distinguished by the narrowness of the epigyne pocket and the way that the insemination ducts are widely spaced.

Behaviour
The spider was initially mainly found in sandy areas. However, it also seems to thrive in swamps and on plants. The species is a specialist hunter and preys on many different types of termites, including members of the genera Macrotermes and Odontotermes. The spider also feeds on other prey like fruit flies and leafhoppers. The spider captures its prey by a process of grasping and holding, injecting its capture with venom. It produces a specialised venom that is dedicated for its prey. It shares a similar environment to Stenaelurillus modestus, but the two species do not seem to compete for food or space. The species was also found foraging along with Habrocestum africanum and Langellurillus squamiger.

Distribution
The species has one of the most extensive ranges of the genus, stretching across southern Africa. It was first identified in Makapansgat and Pretoria in South Africa. it has subsequently been found across the country, with examples coming from the provinces of Gauteng, KwaZulu-Natal, Limpopo, Mpumalanga and North West. It has been identified in Francistown, Botswana, initially from examples collected in 2006, and in Manicaland and Tsholotsho in Zimbabwe. It has also been found in Manica, Mozambique. Both adults and juveniles have been studied.

References

Citations

Bibliography

Arthropods of Botswana
Arthropods of Mozambique
Arthropods of Zimbabwe
Salticidae
Spiders described in 1901
Spiders of South Africa
Taxa named by Wanda Wesołowska